Galadriel is a major character in British author J. R. R. Tolkien's legendarium.

Galadriel may also refer to:
Galadriel Stineman, an American actress and model
Galadriel Mirkwood, the name of immunologist Polly Matzinger's Afghan Hound
Galadriel (band), an Australian progressive rock band
Galadriel Hopkins, the protagonist of The Great Gilly Hopkins by American author Katherine Paterson. 
"Galadriel's Lament in Lórien", a subtitle for the poem Namárië by J. R. R. Tolkien